Maria O'Brien (born 14 May 1970) is an English darts player who plays in World Darts Federation (WDF) events.

Career
O'Brien reached the Semi-Final of the World Masters in 2016. In 2017, she reached the Last 16 of the BDO World Trophy and won the Romanian Classic. She qualified for the 2018 BDO World Darts Championship as the 13th seed, facing Sharon Prins in the last 16, where she lost 0–2.

World Championship results

BDO/WDF
 2018: First round (lost to Sharon Prins 0–2)
 2019: Semi-finals (lost to Mikuru Suzuki 0–2)
 2020: First round (lost to Mikuru Suzuki 1–2)
 2022: Quarter-finals (lost to Rhian O'Sullivan 0-2)

References

External links
 Profile and stats on Darts Database

Living people
English darts players
British Darts Organisation players
1970 births
Professional Darts Corporation women's players